Rajpracha Sport Resort is a multi-purpose stadium in Nakhon Ratchasima Province , Thailand. It is currently used mostly for football matches.  The stadium holds 3,000 people.

Football venues in Thailand
Multi-purpose stadiums in Thailand
Buildings and structures in Nakhon Ratchasima province
Sport in Nakhon Ratchasima province